David Bower (born 1969) is a Welsh actor, best known for his role as David in the hit romantic comedy Four Weddings and a Funeral. Born in Wrexham, North Wales, he is deaf and a BSL user and took his degree in the British Theatre of the Deaf (established by Pat Keysell). After university he joined what became the Signdance Collective working as sign dancer and choreographer. The collective was re-established in 2001 with Bower as artistic director and Isolte Avila as Dance Director. In 2012 the collective is devising a new production "Desire", featuring the songs of the band Dead Days Beyond Help, which will premier at the Warehouse Theatre, Croydon from 13 to 19 April 2012.

In addition to film and television, Bower has also performed in radio plays for the BBC.

Early life
Bower's deafness started with complications at birth which could have been fatal, but was not diagnosed until he was five years old. From that age he wore body hearing aids, bulky transistor radio-style devices. He later attended the Mary Hare Grammar School near his home in Berkshire. Although supported by a very caring family, Bower found himself bullied by both hearing children and other deaf children. In 1986, after attending a loud rock music gig he developed tinnitus which affected the nature of his residual hearing. His deafness progressed and years later he became profoundly deaf.

Credits

Film and television

Radio

Opera

References

External links

Four Weddings and a Funeral at Disability Films
Signdance Collective David Bower's U.K based Company

1969 births
People from Wrexham
Welsh male film actors
Welsh male radio actors
Welsh male television actors
British choreographers
Welsh male dancers
Living people
Male deaf actors
Welsh deaf people
BSL users